FC Phosphor is a football club based in Bandar Seri Begawan, Brunei. They are participating in the 2018 Brunei-Muara District League.

References

External links
 Club's official website

Football clubs in Brunei
Association football clubs established in 2000